Vaseux Protected Area is a provincial park in the Okanagan region of British Columbia, Canada. It was established on April 18, 2001 to protect the habitats of a number of blue-listed and red-listed species, most notably the winter rangeland for California Bighorn Sheep. The protected area adds to the similarly sized Vaseux-Bighorn National Wildlife Area that was established by the Canadian Wildlife Service in 1979.

See also
Vaseux Lake
Vaseux Lake Provincial Park

References

Provincial parks of British Columbia
Regional District of Okanagan-Similkameen